The Supreme Court of British Columbia is the superior trial court for the province of British Columbia, Canada. The Court hears civil and criminal law cases as well as appeals from the Provincial Court of British Columbia. There are 90 judicial positions on the Court in addition to supernumerary judges, making for a grand total of 108 judges. There are also 13 Supreme Court masters who hear and dispose of a wide variety of applications in chambers.

The court was established in 1859 as the "Supreme Court of the Mainland of British Columbia" to distinguish it from the "Supreme Court of Vancouver Island". The two courts merged in 1870 under the present name.

Jurisdiction
The British Columbia Supreme Court is a court of record, having original jurisdiction in all cases, civil and criminal, arising in British Columbia. The Court has inherent jurisdiction under the Constitution of Canada in addition to any jurisdiction granted to it by federal or provincial statute.

The Court has jurisdiction in any civil dispute, including those matters where the dollar amount involved is within the jurisdiction of the Small Claims division of the Provincial Court. Under the Criminal Code, the Court is included as a "superior court of criminal jurisdiction", meaning that it has exclusive jurisdiction for the trial of serious crimes within British Columbia.

The Court also hears some appeals from the Provincial Court and some administrative tribunals.  Appeals from its own judgments are heard by the Court of Appeal of British Columbia.

The Supreme Court is also responsible for call ceremonies for admitting lawyers and notaries public where the respective oath of office is administered by a justice.

Justices and masters
All justices of the Supreme Court (including the position of Chief Justice and Associate Chief Justice) are appointed by the federal cabinet, on recommendation of the Minister of Justice. All justices have full jurisdiction over any matter before the Court.

It is court protocol to refer to the judges of the Court as "justices".  Prior to 2021, justices in the court were addressed as "my Lord" or "my Lady". As of 2021, by directive of the Chief Justice, the terms "my Lord" and "my Lady" are to be avoided. Rather, Justices are addressed as "Chief Justice", "Associate Chief Justice", "Justice", "Madam Justice" or "Mr. Justice" as context requires. 

Masters are appointed by the provincial cabinet, on recommendation of the Attorney General in consultation with the Chief Justice. As provincial appointees, masters do not have inherent jurisdiction. Their jurisdiction is limited to those matters granted to them by statute and the Rules of Court. Masters preside in chambers, where they usually hear interlocutory applications and other pre-trial matters. Masters cannot hear civil trials and do not preside in criminal matters. In court, Masters were formerly addressed as "Master," but in a practice direction issued on September 6, 1991, then Chief Justice Esson advised the most appropriate form of address would be "your Honour". Masters also sit and hear matters as registrars, hearing such matters as assessments of solicitors fees and accounts.

Judicial districts

The British Columbia Supreme Court sits in eight judicial districts called "counties". This is the only usage of "county" in British Columbia, which is a reference only to such court districts and has no similarity to the meaning in other provinces of Canada, the United States or United Kingdom. Prior to 1990, there existed in British Columbia a County Court, an intermediate court between the Provincial Court and the Supreme Court. In 1990, the County Court was merged with the Supreme Court and its judges became justices of the Supreme Court. The judicial districts of the Supreme Court have the same boundaries of the counties of the former County Court. The judicial districts are: Cariboo; Kootenay; Nanaimo; Prince Rupert; Vancouver Westminister; Victoria; and Yale. Within each county, or judicial district, justices are resident in the following locations:
 Abbotsford 
 Chilliwack
 Cranbrook
 Kamloops
 Kelowna
 Nanaimo
 Nelson
 New Westminster
 Prince George
 Prince Rupert
 Victoria
 Vancouver

The Supreme Court also holds sittings in the following court locations for which there is not a resident justice: 

 Campbell River
 Courtenay
 Dawson Creek
 Duncan
 Fort Nelson
 Fort St. John
 Golden
 Penticton
 Port Alberni
 Powell River
 Quesnel
 Revelstoke
 Rossland
 Salmon Arm
 Smithers
 Terrace
 Vernon
 Williams Lake

Chief Justices of the Supreme Court
Prior to 1909, when the British Columbia Court of Appeal was established, the Chief Justice of the Supreme Court was considered the Chief Justice of British Columbia.

Associate Chief Justices of the Supreme Court

References

External links
 Supreme Court of British Columbia website
 List of Current and Previous Justices
 Public Legal Education - Supreme Court of BC
 Public Legal Education - Supreme Court Self-Help
 Supreme Court Civil Rules

British Columbia courts
British_Columbia
1870 establishments in Canada
Courts and tribunals established in 1870